21st New York Film Critics Circle Awards
January 21, 1956(announced December 27, 1955)

Marty
The 21st New York Film Critics Circle Awards honored the best filmmaking of 1955.

Winners
Best Film:
Marty
Best Actor:
Ernest Borgnine - Marty
Best Actress:
Anna Magnani - The Rose Tattoo
Best Director:
David Lean - Summertime
Best Foreign Language Film (tie):
Diabolique (Les diaboliques) • France
Umberto D. • Italy

References

External links
1955 Awards

1955
New York Film Critics Circle Awards, 1955
New York Film Critics Circle Awards
New York Film Critics Circle Awards
New York Film Critics Circle Awards
New York Film Critics Circle Awards